Itsari (Dargwa: ИцIари) is a rural locality (a selo) and the administrative centre of Itsarinsky Selsoviet, Dakhadayevsky District, Republic of Dagestan, Russia. The population was 225 as of 2010.

Geography
Itsari is located 55 km southwest of Urkarakh (the district's administrative centre) by road. Khuduts and Dzilebki are the nearest rural localities.

Nationalities 
Dargins live there.

References 

Rural localities in Dakhadayevsky District